James Lee Jamerson (January 29, 1936 – August 2, 1983) was an American bass player. He was the uncredited bassist on most of the Motown Records hits in the 1960s and early 1970s (Motown did not list session musician credits on their releases until 1971), and is now regarded as one of the most influential bass players in modern music history. He was inducted into the Rock and Roll Hall of Fame in 2000. As a session musician he played on twenty-three Billboard Hot 100 number-one hits, as well as fifty-six R&B number-one hits.

In its special issue "The 100 Greatest Bass Players" in 2017, Bass Player magazine ranked Jamerson number one and the most influential bass guitarist. In 2020, Rolling Stone magazine ranked Jamerson number one in its list of the 50 greatest bassists of all time.

Early life
A native of Edisto Island, South Carolina, he was born to James Jamerson Sr. and Elizabeth Bacon. He was raised in part by his grandmother who played piano, and his aunt who sang in church choir. As a child he was a competent piano player and performed in public. He briefly played the trombone. As a teenager he was a reserved person, and passionate about music. He listened to gospel, blues and jazz music on the radio.

Motown
Jamerson moved with his mother to Detroit in 1954. He attended Northwestern High School; there he started on the upright bass. He began playing in Detroit area blues and jazz clubs and was influenced by jazz bassists Ray Brown, Paul Chambers and Percy Heath. He was offered a scholarship to study music at Wayne State University, and he declined. After graduating from high school, he continued performing in Detroit clubs. He joined blues singer Washboard Willie's band and later toured with Jackie Wilson. His increasingly solid reputation started providing him opportunities for sessions at various local recording studios. Starting in 1959, he found steady work at Berry Gordy's Hitsville U.S.A. studio, home of the Motown record label. He played bass on the Smokey Robinson single "Way Over There" (1959), John Lee Hooker album Burnin''' (1962) and The Reflections' "(Just Like) Romeo and Juliet" (1964). There he became a member of a core of studio musicians who informally called themselves The Funk Brothers. This close-knit group of musicians performed on the vast majority of Motown recordings during most of the 1960s. Jamerson's earliest sessions were performed on double bass but, in the early 1960s, he switched to playing an electric Fender Precision Bass for the most part.

Like Jamerson, most of the Funk Brothers were jazz musicians who had been recruited by Gordy. For many years, they maintained a schedule of recording during the day at Motown's small basement "Studio A" (which they nicknamed "the Snakepit"), then playing gigs in jazz clubs at night. They also occasionally toured the U.S. with Motown artists. For most of their career, however, the Funk Brothers went uncredited on Motown singles and albums, and their pay was considerably less than that received by the main artists or the label, hence their occasional freelance work elsewhere. Eventually, Jamerson was put on retainer for $1,000 a week (US$ in  dollars), which afforded him and his expanding family a comfortable lifestyle.

Jamerson's discography at Motown reads as a catalog of soul hits of the 1960s and early 1970s. His work includes hits such as, among hundreds of others, "You Can't Hurry Love" by The Supremes, "My Girl" by The Temptations, "Shotgun" by Jr. Walker & the All Stars, "For Once in My Life" and "I Was Made to Love Her" by Stevie Wonder, "Going to a Go-Go" by The Miracles, "Dancing in the Street" by Martha and the Vandellas, "I Heard It Through the Grapevine" by Gladys Knight & the Pips and later by Marvin Gaye, and most of the album What's Going On by Marvin Gaye, "Reach Out I'll Be There" and "Bernadette" by the Four Tops. He occasionally recorded for other labels, such as "Boom Boom" by John Lee Hooker in 1962 and "Higher and Higher" by Jackie Wilson in 1967. Motown released 537 singles in 1960s and over 200 albums. According to fellow Funk Brothers in the 2002 documentary Standing in the Shadows of Motown, Gaye was desperate to have Jamerson play on "What's Going On", and went to several bars to find the bassist. When he did, he brought Jamerson to the studio, but Jamerson was too intoxicated to stay upright, so James played the classic line while lying flat on his back. Jamerson had stopped touring in 1964 and did studio work on a full-time basis. He is reported to have played on nearly every Motown recording between 1963 and 1968, which includes over 60 top-fifteen pop singles. Jamerson performed on 23 number-one hits on the pop charts, a record narrowly surpassed only by Paul McCartney of The Beatles who cites Jamerson as an influence, and he performed on 56 number-one hits on the R&B charts.

Style and influence

Jamerson is noted for expanding the musical style and role of bass playing in popular music of the time, which, (in 1950s and '60s R&B, rock and roll, and country), largely consisted of root notes, fifths and simple, repetitive patterns. By contrast, many of Jamerson's basslines relied heavily on chromatic runs, syncopation, ghost notes and inversions, with frequent use of open strings. His nimble bass playing was considered an integral part of the "Motown Sound". He created melodic lines that were nonetheless locked to the drum groove.

Jamerson's transition from upright to electric bass was at a time when electric bass was a relatively new instrument, and its use and style of play was not well established. Jamerson's background as a jazz musician and upright bassist informed his playing style, and over time his technique and improvisational approach became more nuanced. By mid-1960s, his style became an indispensable part of the Motown sound and in turn impacted popular music. Early examples of Jamerson's impact are "Rescue Me" by Fontella Bass and "You Won't See Me" and "Nowhere Man" by the Beatles.

Bassists who have noted Jamerson's contribution or been influenced by him include Rocco Prestia, Anthony Jackson, Pino Palladino, Paul McCartney, Bob Babbitt, Nathan Watts, Will Lee, Geddy Lee, Chuck Rainey, Marcus Miller, Mike Mills, Phil Chen, John Entwistle, Michael League, Mike Watt, Sting, John Paul Jones, Bernard Odum, Victor Wooten, Robert DeLeo, Glenn Hughes, Tommy Shannon, Suzi Quatro, Ron Asheton, Tony Sales, Peter Cetera, Robert Kool Bell, Bootsy Collins, Michael "Flea" Balzary, Jaco Pastorius, Stanley Clarke, Michael Henderson, Jack Bruce, John Patitucci, Jason Newsted, Rick Danko, Garry Tallent, Alan Gorrie, Jerry Jemmott, Andy Fraser, Brian Wilson and others.

Post-Motown career
Shortly after Motown moved their headquarters to Los Angeles, California, in 1972, Jamerson moved there himself and found occasional studio work, but his relationship with Motown officially ended in 1973. He went on to perform on such 1970s hits as "Neither One of Us" by Gladys Knight & The Pips (1973), "Boogie Down" (Eddie Kendricks, 1974), "Boogie Fever" (The Sylvers, 1976), "You Don't Have to Be a Star (To Be in My Show)" (Marilyn McCoo and Billy Davis Jr., 1976), and "Heaven Must Have Sent You" (Bonnie Pointer, 1979). He also played on recordings by Robert Palmer (Pressure Drop, 1975), Dennis Coffey (Instant Coffey, 1974), Wah Wah Watson (Elementary, 1976), Rhythm Heritage (1976), Al Wilson (1977), Dennis Wilson (Pacific Ocean Blue, 1977), Eloise Laws (1977), Smokey Robinson (1978), Ben E. King (1978), Hubert Laws (1979), Tavares (1980), Joe Sample/David T. Walker (Swing Street Cafe, 1981), and Bloodstone (1982). However, in Los Angeles Jamerson was not working with a steady group of musicians, and he was not as free to improvise. He felt out of place and over time his increased dependence on alcohol affected his work. As other musicians went on to use high-tech amplifiers, round-wound strings, and simpler, more repetitive bass lines incorporating new techniques like slapping, Jamerson's style fell out of favor with local producers as he was reluctant to try new things. By the 1980s he was unable to get any serious gigs working as a session musician.

Personal life and death
Jamerson married Annie Wells shortly before graduating from high school. They had four children. His son, James Jamerson Jr. (1957–2016), was a professional session bassist and a member of the disco band Chanson. He had two other sons, Joey and Derek, and a daughter Dorene (Penny).

Long troubled by alcoholism, Jamerson died of complications from cirrhosis of the liver, heart failure and pneumonia on August 2, 1983, in Los Angeles. He is interred at Detroit's historic Woodlawn Cemetery.

Recognition
Jamerson (as is the case with the other Funk Brothers) received little formal recognition for his lifetime contributions. His work was uncredited until later in his career, and he remained largely anonymous, even to bassists who emulated his style. The first time he was credited on a major Motown release was in 1971 for his performance on Marvin Gaye's What's Going On. He was noted as "the incomparable James Jamerson" on the record's sleeve.

Jamerson was the subject of a book by Allan Slutsky in 1989 titled Standing in the Shadows of Motown. The book includes a biography of Jamerson, transcriptions of his bass lines, two CDs in which 26 bassists such as Pino Palladino, John Entwistle, Chuck Rainey, and Geddy Lee speak about Jamerson and play the transcriptions. His story was featured in the subsequent 2002 documentary film of the same title. Jamerson's work has continued to be the subject of various publications.

Jamerson was inducted into the Rock and Roll Hall of Fame in 2000, among the first-ever group of "sidemen" to be inducted. He received a Grammy Lifetime Achievement Award in 2004, and he was inducted into the Musicians Hall of Fame in 2007 both as a member of the Funk Brothers. In 2009 he was inducted into the Fender Hall of Fame by fellow Motown session bassist and friend, Bob Babbitt. He received the Bass Player'' magazine's Lifetime Achievement Award in 2011. He received the Samson, Hartke and Zoom International Bassist Award in 2012. He was awarded a bust at the Hollywood Guitar Center's Rock Walk, and in 2013 the Funk Brothers received a star on the Hollywood Walk of Fame. In 2015 songwriter and bassist Brian Wilson of the Beach Boys named Jamerson as his favorite bassist.

Jamerson has received several accolades in his home state of South Carolina. These include a two-day tribute hosted by the Charleston Jazz Initiative and the College of Charleston's Avery Research Center (2003), the Gullah/GeeChee Anointed Spirit Award (2008), the Independent Tone Award for lifetime achievement (2016), the Dr. Martin Luther King Dream Keeper Award (2018), induction to the Lowcountry Music Hall of Fame (2018), induction to the Carolina Beach Music Hall of Fame (2018). Also, the South Carolina Senate, the House of Representatives and the town of Edisto Island have passed resolutions in recognition of his contributions.

Jamerson's equipment
Jamerson started on a school owned upright bass. After graduating from high school, he bought a German upright bass which he later used on such Motown hits as "My Guy" by Mary Wells and "(Love Is Like a) Heat Wave" by Martha and the Vandellas. This instrument is in the Rock and Roll Hall of Fame.

In 1960 to 1961 he transitioned to electric bass. Jamerson played mainly the Fender Precision Bass, but is known to have briefly used a Fender Bass V and a Hagström eight-string later in his career. He continued to use the upright bass occasionally, as in 1964's "My Guy".

His first electric bass was a 1957 Precision Bass, refinished in black, with a gold-anodized pickguard and maple fretboard, nicknamed "Black Beauty". The bass was previously owned by his fellow bass player Horace "Chili" Ruth. But the instrument was soon stolen.

After his 1957 Precision Bass was stolen, he briefly replaced it with an early sixties sunburst Precision which was also stolen. He then acquired a stock 1962 Fender Precision Bass which was dubbed "The Funk Machine" by his fellow musicians. It had a three-tone sunburst finish, a tortoiseshell pickguard, rosewood fretboard and chrome pickup and bridge covers (the latter containing a piece of foam used to dampen sustain and some overtones). On the heel of the instrument, he carved the word "FUNK" in blue ink. He typically set its volume and tone knobs on full. This instrument was also stolen, just days before Jamerson's death in 1983, and never recovered.

Jamerson used La Bella heavy-gauge (.052–.110) flatwound strings which were never replaced, unless a string broke. He did not particularly take care of the instrument, as he stated: "The dirt keeps the funk". The neck may have eventually warped, as many claimed it was impossible to play. While this made it more difficult to fret, Jamerson believed it improved the quality of the tone. In the mid-1970s, a producer attempted to modernize Jamerson's sound by asking the bassist to switch to brighter-sounding roundwound bass strings, but Jamerson politely declined.

One aspect of Jamerson's upright playing that carried over to the electric bass guitar was the fact that he generally used only his right index finger to pluck the strings while resting his third and fourth fingers on the chrome pickup cover. Jamerson's index finger even earned its own nickname: "The Hook". Another aspect of Jamerson's upright playing that carried over was his use of open strings, a technique long used by jazz bass players, to pivot around the fretboard which served to give his lines a fluid feeling. He played with a relaxed and light touch.

Jamerson's amplifier of choice at club performances was an Ampeg B-15; in larger venues, he used a blue Kustom with twin 15-inch speakers. On both, the bass knob was typically turned up full and the treble turned halfway up. On most of his studio recordings, his bass was plugged directly into the custom-made mixing console together with the guitars from Eddie Willis, Robert White and Joe Messina. He adjusted the console so that his sound was slightly overdriven and had a mild tube compression.

In 2017, it was reported that Jamerson gave a 1961 Fender Precision bass to bassist Billy Hayes in 1967 or 1968; the instrument was auctioned in 2017. In 1977, Jamerson was photographed with a 1965–1968 Precision bass (a line of instruments which had a transition logo). There is speculation that in mid to late-1960s Jamerson's then-primary instrument was parted with, and that he acquired and replaced it with a 1966 model.

Quotations
In a 1983 interview with Musician magazine, Jamerson said about Motown's songwriting-production team that they "would give me the chord sheet, but they couldn't write for me. When they did, it didn't sound right. (...) When they gave me that chord sheet, I'd look at it, but then start doing what I felt and what I thought would fit. (...) I'd hear the melody line from the lyrics and I'd build the bass line around that."

Motown's founder Berry Gordy called Jamerson an "incredible improviser" and said "I, like some of the other producers, would not do a session unless at least two of the Funk Brothers were present – namely, [drummer] Benny Benjamin and James Jamerson."

Notes

References

Further reading

External links
 James Jamerson's recorded bass parts isolated
 BassLand James Jamerson page
 James Jamerson transcriptions and educational resources
 

1936 births
1983 deaths
20th-century African-American musicians
20th-century American bass guitarists
20th-century American male musicians
20th-century double-bassists
African-American guitarists
Alcohol-related deaths in California
American double-bassists
American funk bass guitarists
American male bass guitarists
American rhythm and blues bass guitarists
American session musicians
Burials at Woodlawn Cemetery (Detroit)
Deaths from cirrhosis
Deaths from pneumonia in California
Guitarists from Detroit
Guitarists from South Carolina
Male double-bassists
Northwestern High School (Michigan) alumni
People from Edisto Island, South Carolina
The Funk Brothers members